Chimney Hill is a census-designated place (CDP) in the town of Wilmington, Windham County, Vermont, United States. As of the 2020 census, it had a population of 263.

The CDP is in southwestern Windham County, in the western part of Wilmington. It is a residential area built on the southeastern slopes of Haystack Mountain and is bordered to the north and west by the Green Mountain National Forest.

References 

Populated places in Windham County, Vermont
Census-designated places in Windham County, Vermont
Census-designated places in Vermont